The Jacksonville State Gamecocks men's basketball team is the men's basketball team that represents Jacksonville State University in Jacksonville, Alabama. JSU is a member of the ASUN Conference, having returned to that conference on July 1, 2021, after an 18-year absence spent in the Ohio Valley Conference. The Gamecocks are coached by Ray Harper. During their time as a member of Division II, they were national champions in 1985.

In 2017, Jacksonville State won the OVC championship and made its first appearance in the Division I tournament.

Seasons
Jacksonville State's records season-by-season since joining Division I in 1995.

Postseason

NCAA Division I tournament results
The Gamecocks have appeared in the NCAA Division I tournament two times. Their record is 0–2. Due to Bellarmine winning the 2022 ASUN tournament and still being in transition to Division I, Jacksonville State received the automatic bid to the NCAA tournament as regular season champions.

NCAA Division II tournament results
The Gamecocks have appeared in the NCAA Division II tournament eight times. Their combined record is 17–8. They were National Champions in 1985.

CBI results
They Gamecocks have appeared in the College Basketball Invitational (CBI) one time. Their record is 2–1.

Gamecocks in international leagues
 Mohamed Abu Arisha (born 1997), Israeli basketball player for Hapoel Be'er Sheva of the Israeli Basketball Premier League and the Israel national basketball team
 Christian Cunningham (born 1997), basketball player in the Israeli Basketball Premier League
 Norbertas Giga (born 1995), basketball player in the Lithuanian Basketball League

References

External links
Team website